Ladislav Vlček (born September 26, 1981) is a Czech professional ice hockey player. He was selected by the Dallas Stars in the 6th round (192nd overall) of the 2000 NHL Entry Draft.

Vlček  played with HC Kladno in the Czech Extraliga during the 2010–11 Czech Extraliga season.

Career statistics

Regular season and playoffs

International

References

External links

1981 births
Czech ice hockey forwards
Rytíři Kladno players
Living people
Dallas Stars draft picks
World Games bronze medalists
Competitors at the 2013 World Games